Mahmudi (also Romanized as Maḩmūdī) is a village in Band-e Zarak Rural District, in the Central District of Minab County, Hormozgan Province, Iran. At the 2006 census, its population was 169, in 31 families.

References 

Populated places in Minab County